Glenn Viel is a French chef. He was awarded 3 Michelin stars at the restaurant l'Oustau de Baumanière..

Restaurants 
Glenn Viel is the chef of L'Oustau de Baumanière in Les Baux-de-Provence since March 2015. He was awarded 3 Michelin stars in 2020 at age 39, and became the youngest French chef to receive 3 stars

Appearance and activities 
Viel appears in the documentary A Chef's Voyage (2020).

Viel is a jury member in season 13 of Top Chef France.

References 

Living people
1980 births